San Pasqual Battlefield State Historic Park honors the soldiers who fought in the 1846 Battle of San Pasqual, the bloodiest battle in California during the Mexican–American War. The battle was fought between United States troops under the command of General Stephen Kearny, and the Californio forces under the command of General Andres Pico on December 6, 1846.

The Native Sons of the Golden West were instrumental in raising money, preserving and ultimately creating the park which was then given to the State of California. It is now a California State Park as well as a California Historical Landmark. The  park is next to the San Diego Zoo Safari Park, at San Pasqual Valley Road, south of Escondido, California on Highway 78 in San Diego County.

The park is open only on weekends, and features a visitor center with displays about the cultural history of the San Pasqual Valley, exhibits, and a movie about the battle. Living history presentations are held at the park, with volunteers from the San Pasqual Battlefield Volunteer Association.

References

External links
 San Pasqual Battlefield State Historic Park – official site
 San Pasqual Battlefield Volunteer Association

California State Historic Parks
Battles of the Conquest of California
Military and war museums in California
Museums in San Diego County, California
Parks in San Diego County, California
History museums in California